An article is any member of a class of dedicated words that are used with noun phrases to mark the identifiability of the referents of the noun phrases. The category of articles constitutes a part of speech.

In English, both "the" and "a(n)" are articles, which combine with nouns to form noun phrases. Articles typically specify the grammatical definiteness of the noun phrase, but in many languages, they carry additional grammatical information such as gender, number, and case. Articles are part of a broader category called determiners, which also include demonstratives, possessive determiners, and quantifiers.

Types

Definite article

A definite article is an article that marks a definite noun phrase. Definite articles such as English the are used to refer to a particular member of a group. It may be something that the speaker has already mentioned or it may be otherwise something uniquely specified.

For example, Sentence 1 uses the definite article and thus expresses a request for a particular book. In contrast, Sentence 2 uses an indefinite article and thus conveys that the speaker would be satisfied with any book.

 Give me the book.
 Give me a book.

The definite article can also be used in English to indicate a specific class among other classes:
 The cabbage white butterfly lays its eggs on members of the Brassica genus.
However, recent developments show that definite articles are morphological elements linked to certain noun types due to lexicalization. Under this point of view, definiteness does not play a role in the selection of a definite article more than the lexical entry attached to the article.

Indefinite article

An indefinite article is an article that marks an indefinite noun phrase. Indefinite articles are those such as English "some" or "a", which do not refer to a specific identifiable entity. Indefinites are commonly used to introduce a new discourse referent which can be referred back to in subsequent discussion:

 A monster ate a cookie. His name is Cookie Monster.

Indefinites can also be used to generalize over entities who have some property in common:

 A cookie is a wonderful thing to eat.

Indefinites can also be used to refer to specific entities whose precise identity is unknown or unimportant.

 A monster must have broken into my house last night and eaten all my cookies.
 A friend of mine told me that happens frequently to people who live on Sesame Street.

Indefinites also have predicative uses:

 Leaving my door unlocked was a bad decision.

Indefinite noun phrases are widely studied within linguistics, in particular because of their ability to take exceptional scope.

Proper article

A proper article indicates that its noun is proper, and refers to a unique entity. It may be the name of a person, the name of a place, the name of a planet, etc. The Māori language has the proper article a, which is used for personal nouns; so, "a Pita" means "Peter". In Māori, when the personal nouns have the definite or indefinite article as an important part of it, both articles are present; for example, the phrase "a Te Rauparaha", which contains both the proper article a and the definite article Te refers to the person name Te Rauparaha.

The definite article is sometimes also used with proper names, which are already specified by definition (there is just one of them). For example: the Amazon, the Hebrides. In these cases, the definite article may be considered superfluous. Its presence can be accounted for by the assumption that they are shorthand for a longer phrase in which the name is a specifier, i.e. the Amazon River, the Hebridean Islands. Where the nouns in such longer phrases cannot be omitted, the definite article is universally kept: the United States, the People's Republic of China.

This distinction can sometimes become a political matter: the former usage the Ukraine stressed the word's Russian meaning of "borderlands"; as Ukraine became a fully independent state following the collapse of the Soviet Union, it requested that formal mentions of its name omit the article. Similar shifts in usage have occurred in the names of Sudan and both Congo (Brazzaville) and Congo (Kinshasa); a move in the other direction occurred with The Gambia. In certain languages, such as French and Italian, definite articles are used with all or most names of countries: la France/le Canada/l'Allemagne, l'Italia/la Spagna/il Brasile.

Some languages use definite articles with personal names, as in Portuguese (a Maria, literally: "the Maria"), Greek (η Μαρία, ο Γιώργος, ο Δούναβης, η Παρασκευή), and Catalan (la Núria, el/en Oriol). Such usage also occurs colloquially or dialectally in Spanish, German, French, Italian and other languages. In Hungarian, the colloquial use of definite articles with personal names, though widespread, is considered to be a Germanism.

The definite article sometimes appears in American English nicknames such as "the Donald", referring to former president Donald Trump, and "the Gipper", referring to former president Ronald Reagan.

Partitive article

A partitive article is a type of article, sometimes viewed as a type of indefinite article, used with a mass noun such as water, to indicate a non-specific quantity of it. Partitive articles are a class of determiner; they are used in French and Italian in addition to definite and indefinite articles. (In Finnish and Estonian, the partitive is indicated by inflection.) The nearest equivalent in English is some, although it is classified as a determiner, and English uses it less than French uses de. 
 French: Veux-tu du café ?
 Do you want (some) coffee?

For more information, see the article on the French partitive article.

Haida has a partitive article (suffixed -gyaa) referring to "part of something or... to one or more objects of a given group or category," e.g., tluugyaa uu hal tlaahlaang "he is making a boat (a member of the category of boats)."

Negative article

A negative article specifies none of its noun, and can thus be regarded as neither definite nor indefinite. On the other hand, some consider such a word to be a simple determiner rather than an article. In English, this function is fulfilled by no, which can appear before a singular or plural noun: 
 No man has been on this island.
 No dogs are allowed here.
 No one is in the room.

In German, the negative article is, among other variations, kein, in opposition to the indefinite article ein.
Ein Hund – a dog
Kein Hund – no dog

The equivalent in Dutch is geen:
 een hond – a dog
 geen hond – no dog

Zero article

The zero article is the absence of an article. In languages having a definite article, the lack of an article specifically indicates that the noun is indefinite. Linguists interested in X-bar theory causally link zero articles to nouns lacking a determiner. In English, the zero article rather than the indefinite is used with plurals and mass nouns, although the word "some" can be used as an indefinite plural article.

 Visitors end up walking in mud.

Crosslinguistic variation

Articles are found in many Indo-European languages, Semitic languages (only the definite article), and Polynesian languages; however, they are formally absent from many of the world's major languages including Chinese, Japanese, Korean, Mongolian, many Turkic languages (including Tatar, Bashkir, Tuvan and Chuvash), many Uralic languages (incl. Finnic and Saami languages), Indonesian, Hindi-Urdu, Punjabi, Tamil, the Baltic languages, the majority of Slavic languages, the Bantu languages (incl. Swahili). In some languages that do have articles, such as some North Caucasian languages, the use of articles is optional; however, in others like English and German it is mandatory in all cases.

Linguists believe the common ancestor of the Indo-European languages, Proto-Indo-European, did not have articles. Most of the languages in this family do not have definite or indefinite articles: there is no article in Latin or Sanskrit, nor in some modern Indo-European languages, such as the families of Slavic languages (except for Bulgarian and Macedonian, which are rather distinctive among the Slavic languages in their grammar, and some Northern Russian dialects), Baltic languages and many Indo-Aryan languages. Although Classical Greek had a definite article (which has survived into Modern Greek and which bears strong functional resemblance to the German definite article, which it is related to), the earlier Homeric Greek used this article largely as a pronoun or demonstrative, whereas the earliest known form of Greek known as Mycenaean Greek did not have any articles. Articles developed independently in several language families.

Not all languages have both definite and indefinite articles, and some languages have different types of definite and indefinite articles to distinguish finer shades of meaning: for example, French and Italian have a partitive article used for indefinite mass nouns, whereas Colognian has two distinct sets of definite articles indicating focus and uniqueness, and Macedonian uses definite articles in a demonstrative sense, with a tripartite distinction (proximal, medial, distal) based on distance from the speaker or interlocutor. The words this and that (and their plurals, these and those) can be understood in English as, ultimately, forms of the definite article the (whose declension in Old English included thaes, an ancestral form of this/that and these/those).

In many languages, the form of the article may vary according to the gender, number, or case of its noun. In some languages the article may be the only indication of the case. Many languages do not use articles at all, and may use other ways of indicating old versus new information, such as topic–comment constructions.

Tables

{| class="wikitable" 
|+ The articles used in some languages
|-
! Language
! definite article
! partitive article
! indefinite article
|-
|Abkhaz
|a-
|
| -k
|-
|Afrikaans
|die
|
|'n
|-
| Albanian
| -a, -ja, -i, -ri, -ni, -u, -t, -in, -un, -n, -rin, -nin, -në, -ën, -s, -së, -ës, -të, -it, -ët (all suffixes)
| disa
| një
|-
| Arabic
|  or el  (prefix)
|
| -n
|-
| Assamese
| -tû, -ta, -ti, -khôn, -khini, -zôn, -zôni, -dal, -zûpa etc.
| 
| êta, êkhôn, êzôn, êzôni, êdal, êzûpa etc.
|-
| Bangla
|  -টা, -টি, -গুলো, -রা, -খানা
|
| একটি, একটা, কোন
|-
| Breton
| an, al, ar
| 
| un, ul, ur
|-
| Bulgarian 
| -та, -то, -ът, -ят, -те (all suffixes)
| 
| един/някакъв,   една/някаква,   едно/някакво,  едни/някакви
|-
| Catalan
| el, la, l', els, lesses, lo, los, es, sa
| 
| un, una uns, unes
|-
| Cornish
| an
| 
|
|-
|Danish
|Singular: -en, -n -et, -t (all suffixes)
Plural: -ene, -ne (all suffixes)
|
|en, et
|-
| Dutch
| de, het ('t); archaic since 1945/46 but still used in names and idioms: des, der, den
|
| een ('n)
|-
| English
| the
| 
| a, an
|-
| Esperanto
| la
| 
| 
|-
| Finnish (colloquial)
| se
| 
| yks(i)
|-
| French
| le, la, l', les 
|  de, d', du, de la, des,  de l 
| un, une, des  
|-
| German
| der, die, das des, dem, den
|
| ein, eine, einer, eines einem, einen
|-
| Greek
| 
| 
| 
|-
| Hawaiian
| ka, ke nā
|
| he
|-
| Hebrew
|   (prefix)
| 
| 
|-
| Hungarian
| a, az
|
| egy
|-
| Icelandic
| -(i)nn, -(i)n, -(i)ð, -(i)na, -num, -(i)nni, -nu, -(i)ns, -(i)nnar, -nir, -nar, -(u)num, -nna (all suffixes)
|
| 
|-
| Interlingua
| le
| 
| un
|-
| Irish
| an, na, a' (used colloquially)
|
|
|-
| Italian
| il, lo, la, l i, gli, le
| del, dello, della, dell dei, degli, degl', delle
| un, uno, una, un
|-
| Khasi
| u, ka, i ki
| 
| 
|-
| Kurdish
| -eke -ekan
| hendê, birrê
| -êk -anêk
|-
| Latin 
| 
| 
|
|-
| Luxembourgish
| den, déi (d'), dat (d') dem, der
| däers/es, däer/er
| en, eng  engem, enger
|-
| Macedonian 
| -от -ов -он -та -ва -на -то -во -но  -те -ве -не -та  -ва -на (all suffixes) 
| неколку 
| еден една едно  едни
|-
| Manx
| y, yn, n, ny
|
| 
|-
| Malay (Both Malaysia and Indonesian)
| Si (usually informal), Sang (more formal)
|
| 
|-
| Māori
| te (singular), ngā (plural)
|
| he (also for "some")
|-
| Maltese
| (i)l-, (i)ċ-, (i)d-, (i)n-, (i)r-, (i)s-, (i)t-, (i)x-, (i)z-,  (i)ż- (all prefixes)
|
| 
|-
| Nepali
|
|
|euta, euti, ek, anek, kunai
एउटा, एउटी, एक, अनेक, कुनै
|-
| Norwegian (Bokmål)
| Singular: -en, -et, -a (all suffixes)
Plural: -ene, -a (all suffixes)
|
| en, et, ei
|-
| Norwegian (Nynorsk)
| Singular: -en, -et, -a (all suffixes)
Plural: -ane, -ene, -a (all suffixes)
|
| ein, eit, ei
|-
|Papiamento
|e
|
|un
|-
| Pashto
| 
| 
| yaow, yaowə, yaowa, yaowey يو, يوهٔ, يوه, يوې
|-
| Persian
| in, ān
| 
| yek, ye
|-
| Portuguese
| o, a os, as
| 
| um, uma uns, umas
|-
| Quenya
| i, in, n
| 
|
|-
| Romanian
| -(u)l, -le, -(u)a-(u)lui, -i, -lor (all suffixes)
| 
| un, ounui, uneiniște, unor 
|-
| Scots
| the
| 
| a
|-
| Scottish Gaelic
| an, am, a, na, nam, nan
| 
| 
|-
| Sindarin
| i, in, -in, -n, en
| 
|
|-
| Spanish
| el, la, lo, los, las
| 
| un, una unos, unas
|-
|Swedish
|Singular: -en, -n, -et, -t (all suffixes)
Plural: -na, -a, -en (all suffixes)
|
|en, ett
|-
| Welsh
| y, yr,  -'r
|
|
|-
|Yiddish
| דער (der), די (di), דאָס (dos), דעם (dem)
|
| אַ (a), אַן (an)
|}

The following examples show articles which are always suffixed to the noun:

 Albanian: zog, a bird; zogu, the bird
 Aramaic: שלם (shalam), peace; שלמא (shalma), the peace
 Note: Aramaic is written from right to left, so an Aleph is added to the end of the word. ם becomes מ when it is not the final letter. 
 Assamese: "কিতাপ (kitap)", book; "কিতাপখন (kitapkhôn)" : "The book"
 Bengali: "Bôi", book; "Bôiti/Bôita/Bôikhana" : "The Book"
 Bulgarian: стол stol, chair; столът stolǎt, the chair (subject); стола stola, the chair (object)
 Danish: hus, house; huset, the house; if there is an adjective: det gamle hus, the old house
 Icelandic: hestur, horse; hesturinn, the horse
 Macedonian: стол stol, chair; столот stolot, the chair; столов stolov, this chair; столон stolon, that chair
 Persian: sib, apple. (The Persian language does not have definite articles. It has one indefinite article 'yek' that means one. In Persian if a noun is not indefinite, it is a definite noun. "Sib e' man، means my apple. Here 'e' is like 'of' in English; an so literally "Sib e man" means the apple of mine.)
 Romanian: drum, road; drumul, the road (the article is just "l", "u" is a "connection vowel" )
 Swedish and Norwegian: hus, house; huset, the house; if there is an adjective: det gamle (N)/gamla (S) huset, the old house

Examples of prefixed definite articles: 

A different way, limited to the definite article, is used by Latvian and Lithuanian. 
The noun does not change but the adjective can be defined or undefined. In Latvian: galds, a table / the table; balts galds, a white table; baltais galds, the white table. In Lithuanian: stalas, a table / the table; baltas stalas, a white table; baltasis stalas, the white table.

Languages in the above table written in italics are constructed languages and are not natural, that is to say that they have been purposefully invented by an individual (or group of individuals) with some purpose in mind. They do, however, all belong to language families themselves. Esperanto is derived from European languages and therefore all of its roots are found in Proto-Indo-European and cognates can be found in real-world languages like French, German, Italian and English. Interlingua is also based on European languages but with its main source being that of Italic descendant languages: English, French, Spanish, Italian and Portuguese, with German and Russian being secondary sources, with words from further afield (but internationally known and often borrowed) contributing to the language's vocabulary (such as words taken from Japanese, Arabic and Finnish). The result is a supposedly easy-to-learn language for the world. As well as these "auxiliary" languages the list contains two more: Quenya and Sindarin; these two languages were created by Professor Tolkien and used in his fictional works. They are not based on any real-world language family (as are Esperanto and Interlingua), but do share a common history with roots in Common Eldarin.

 Tokelauan 
When using a definite article in Tokelauan language, unlike in some languages like English, if the speaker is speaking of an item, they need not have referred to it previously as long as the item is specific. This is also true when it comes to the reference of a specific person. So, although the definite article used to describe a noun in the Tokelauan language is te, it can also translate to the indefinite article in languages that requires the item being spoken of to have been referenced prior. When translating to English, te could translate to the English definite article the, or it could also translate to the English indefinite article a. An example of how the definite article te can be used as an interchangeable definite or indefinite article in the Tokelauan language would be the sentence “Kua hau te tino”. In the English language, this could be translated as “A man has arrived” or “The man has arrived” where using te as the article in this sentence can represent any man or a particular man. The word he, which is the indefinite article in Tokelauan, is used to describe ‘any such item’, and is encountered most often with negatives and interrogatives. An example of the use of he as an indefinite article is “Vili ake oi k'aumai he toki ”, where ‘he toki ’ mean ‘an axe’. The use of he and te in Tokelauan are reserved for when describing a singular noun. However, when describing a plural noun, different articles are used. For plural definite nouns, rather than te, the article nā is used. ‘Vili ake oi k'aumai nā nofoa’ in Tokelauan would translate to “Do run and bring me the chairs” in English. There are some special cases in which instead of using nā, plural definite nouns have no article before them. The absence of an article is represented by 0. One way that it is usually used is if a large amount or a specific class of things are being described. Occasionally, such as if one was describing an entire class of things in a nonspecific fashion, the singular definite noun te would is used. In English, ‘Ko te povi e kai mutia’ means “Cows eat grass”. Because this is a general statement about cows, te is used instead of nā. The ko serves as a preposition to the “te” The article ni is used for describing a plural indefinite noun. ‘E i ei ni tuhi?’ translates to “Are there any books?'''”

Historical development

Articles often develop by specialization of adjectives or determiners. Their development is often a sign of languages becoming more analytic instead of synthetic, perhaps combined with the loss of inflection as in English, Romance languages, Bulgarian, Macedonian and Torlakian.

Joseph Greenberg in Universals of Human Language describes "the cycle of the definite article": Definite articles (Stage I) evolve from demonstratives, and in turn can become generic articles (Stage II) that may be used in both definite and indefinite contexts, and later merely noun markers (Stage III) that are part of nouns other than proper names and more recent borrowings. Eventually articles may evolve anew from demonstratives.

 Definite articles 

Definite articles typically arise from demonstratives meaning that. For example, the definite articles in most Romance languages—e.g., el, il, le, la, lo, a, o — derive from the Latin demonstratives ille (masculine), illa (feminine) and illud (neuter).

The English definite article the, written þe in Middle English, derives from an Old English demonstrative, which, according to gender, was written se (masculine), seo (feminine) (þe and þeo in the Northumbrian dialect), or þæt (neuter). The neuter form þæt also gave rise to the modern demonstrative that. The ye occasionally seen in pseudo-archaic usage such as "Ye Olde Englishe Tea Shoppe" is actually a form of þe, where the letter thorn (þ) came to be written as a y.

Multiple demonstratives can give rise to multiple definite articles. Macedonian, for example, in which the articles are suffixed, has столот (stolot), the chair; столов (stolov), this chair; and столон (stolon), that chair. These derive from the Proto-Slavic demonstratives *tъ "this, that", *ovъ "this here" and *onъ "that over there, yonder" respectively. Colognian prepositions articles such as in dat Auto, or et Auto, the car; the first being specifically selected, focused, newly introduced, while the latter is not selected, unfocused, already known, general, or generic.

Standard Basque distinguishes between proximal and distal definite articles in the plural (dialectally, a proximal singular and an additional medial grade may also be present). The Basque distal form (with infix -a-, etymologically a suffixed and phonetically reduced form of the distal demonstrative har-/hai-) functions as the default definite article, whereas the proximal form (with infix -o-, derived from the proximal demonstrative hau-/hon-) is marked and indicates some kind of (spatial or otherwise) close relationship between the speaker and the referent (e.g., it may imply that the speaker is included in the referent): etxeak ("the houses") vs. etxeok ("these houses [of ours]"), euskaldunak ("the Basque speakers") vs. euskaldunok ("we, the Basque speakers").

Speakers of Assyrian Neo-Aramaic, a modern Aramaic language that lacks a definite article, may at times use demonstratives  aha and aya (feminine) or awa (masculine) – which translate to "this" and "that", respectively – to give the sense of "the".

 Indefinite articles 

Indefinite articles typically arise from adjectives meaning one. For example, the indefinite articles in the Romance languages—e.g., un, una, une—derive from the Latin adjective unus. Partitive articles, however, derive from Vulgar Latin de illo, meaning (some) of the.

The English indefinite article an is derived from the same root as one. The -n came to be dropped before consonants, giving rise to the shortened form a. The existence of both forms has led to many cases of juncture loss, for example transforming the original a napron into the modern an apron.

The Persian indefinite article is yek'',  meaning one.

See also
 English articles
 Al- (definite article in Arabic)
 Definiteness
 Definite description
 False title

References

External links

 "The Definite Article, 'The': The Most Frequently Used Word in World's Englishes"

Grammar
Parts of speech